Christopher Lowther may refer to:

Christopher Lowther of Little Preston (d. 1718), younger son of Sir William Lowther, ancestor of the Earls of Lonsdale
Sir Christopher Lowther, 1st Baronet (d. 1644)
Sir Christopher Lowther, 3rd Baronet (1666–1731)
Christopher Lowther (politician) (1887-1935), Conservative MP for North Cumberland 1918–1921